Hurricane Patricia was the strongest tropical cyclone on record worldwide in terms of wind speed and the second-most intense on record worldwide in terms of pressure, behind Typhoon Tip in 1979, with a minimum atmospheric pressure of 872 mbar (hPa). Originating from a sprawling disturbance near the Gulf of Tehuantepec, south of Mexico, in mid-October 2015, Patricia was first classified a tropical depression on October 20. Initial development was slow, with only modest strengthening within the first day of its classification. The system later became a tropical storm and was named Patricia, the twenty-fourth named storm of the annual hurricane season. Exceptionally favorable environmental conditions fueled explosive intensification on October 22. A well-defined eye developed within an intense central dense overcast and Patricia grew from a tropical storm to a Category 5 hurricane in just 24 hours—a near-record pace. This made it the most intense tropical cyclone on record in the Western Hemisphere and the strongest globally in terms of one-minute maximum sustained winds.

This still made it the strongest landfalling Pacific hurricane on record. Patricia continued to weaken extremely quickly, faster than it had intensified, as it interacted with the mountainous terrain of Mexico. Within 24 hours of moving ashore, Patricia weakened into a tropical depression and dissipated soon thereafter, late on October 24.

The precursor to Patricia produced widespread flooding rains in Central America. Hundreds of thousands of people were directly affected by the storm, mostly in Guatemala. At least six fatalities were attributed to the event: four in El Salvador, one in Guatemala, and one in Nicaragua. Damage in Chetumal reached MX$1.4 billion (US$85.3 million).

As a tropical cyclone, Patricia's effects in Mexico were tremendous; however, the affected areas were predominantly rural, lessening the number of people directly impacted. Violent winds tore roofs from structures and stripped coastal areas of their vegetation. Preliminary assessments indicated hundreds of homes to be destroyed; seven fatalities were linked to the hurricane directly or indirectly, including one during evacuations. Total damage from Patricia was estimated to be at least $462.8 million (2015 USD); the damage in Mexico alone was estimated to be in excess of MX$5.4 billion (US$325 million), with agriculture and infrastructure comprising the majority of losses. Flooding partially associated with remnant moisture from Patricia inflicted US$52.5 million in damage across Southern Texas.

Meteorological history

On October 11, 2015, an area of disturbed weather traversed Central America and emerged over the eastern Pacific Ocean. The disturbance moved slowly over the next few days, later merging with a tropical wave on October 15. The merger of these systems and the effects of a concurrent Tehuantepec gap wind event spurred the formation of a broad area of low pressure. A mid-level ridge to the north steered the depression generally west and later pulled it north along an arcing path.

Development was initially slowed by locally cooler sea surface temperatures and dry air, and the depression became Tropical Storm Patricia later that day. Once clear of the unfavorable region, Patricia traversed anomalously warm waters within an environment exceptionally conducive to rapid intensification. Dramatic strengthening began late on October 21 and continued through October 23. Patricia reached hurricane strength shortly after 00:00 UTC on October 22, featuring prominent outflow, well-defined banding features, and a developing eye. Data from hurricane hunters investigating the cyclone indicated Patricia to have reached Category 4 status on the Saffir–Simpson hurricane wind scale by 18:00 UTC.

By the early hours of October 23, a clear northward turn took place followed by acceleration northeast. In the NHC's report on Patricia, it is noted that the hurricane may have surpassed Typhoon Tip as the strongest tropical cyclone ever observed, but lack of direct observations at the time of its peak prevents analysis of such.

Later on October 23, rapid weakening ensued as an eyewall replacement cycle took shape and wind shear increased. In the five hours up until landfall in Mexico, Patricia weakened at an unprecedented rate while still over water. This made Patricia the most intense landfalling Pacific hurricane on record. Once onshore, the high terrain of the Sierra Madre mountains accelerated Patricia's weakening. The low- and mid-level circulations of the tropical cyclone decoupled, with the latter accelerating northeast, and Patricia dissipated on October 24 over central Mexico, less than 18 hours after moving ashore.

Records

Hurricane Patricia set multiple records for maximum strength, rate of intensification, and rate of weakening throughout its relatively short existence. In terms of central pressure, it is also the second-most intense tropical cyclone ever recorded worldwide, just shy of Typhoon Tip in 1979 which had a minimum pressure of 870 mbar (hPa).

Patricia's one-minute maximum sustained winds ranked as the highest ever reliably observed or estimated in a tropical cyclone, surpassing Typhoon Haiyan of 2013. The magnitude of Patricia's rapid intensification is among the fastest ever observed. During the same period, Patricia's central pressure fell by 95 mbar (hPa). Despite record over-water weakening prior to striking Mexico, Patricia became the most intense Pacific hurricane to make landfall, with a pressure of 932 mbar (hPa).

Preparations

Before Hurricane Patricia arrived, the Government of Mexico issued multiple watches and warnings for coastal communities. A hurricane watch was first raised at 09:00 UTC on October 21, encompassing areas of Michoacán, Colima, and Jalisco. A tropical storm watch also covered portions of Guerrero. As Patricia intensified, the government issued a hurricane warning for areas between Cabo Corrientes, Jalisco, and Punta San Telmo, Michoacán; a tropical storm warning supplemented this for areas farther north and east. The hurricane warning was extended northward to include areas south of San Blas, Nayarit, on October 23. Once the storm moved inland and the threat of damaging winds diminished, these warnings were gradually discontinued on October 24.

Following Patricia's upgrade to Category 5 status, the National Hurricane Center called the storm "potentially catastrophic", a source of criticism and praise from various media. Citing the relatively limited damage and loss of life, some outlets, including the Associated Press, claimed the agency was exaggerating the danger posed by the storm. However, most outlets praised them for effectively communicating the dire threat and potentially saving lives from an exceptionally powerful hurricane.

Across Michoacán, Colima, Jalisco, and Nayarit, 1,782 shelters were opened on October 22 with a collective capacity of 258,000 people. Officials in Manzanillo began distributing sandbags during the afternoon of October 22. Schools across Guerrero and Jalisco suspended activities for October 22 and 23, respectively. Civil protection officials planned to evacuate roughly 50,000 people from Colima, Jalisco, and Nayarit. To expedite the process, 2 aircraft and 600 buses were used to shuttle evacuees. Ultimately, 8,500 people evacuated prior to the storm's arrival, including 2,600 in Cabo Corrientes. One person died during an evacuation in Jalisco. Roughly 25,000 personnel from the Mexican Army, Navy, and Federal Police were deployed preemptively. More than 500 Red Cross volunteers were on standby. The Mexican Red Cross prepositioned food for 3,500 families.

Approximately  of aid was prepositioned in Colima for distribution after the hurricane's passage. The Electric Federal Commission dispatched 2,500 crewmen, 152 cranes, 15 all-terrain vehicles, 4 helicopters, and 84 generators to cope with potential power outages. Mexican authorities received praise for effectively carrying out emergency preparations.

Impact from precursor disturbance

The precursor of Patricia was a large and sprawling system that affected much of Central America with heavy rain for several days. Rainfall was enhanced by the presence of multiple systems, including a tropical wave and a second disturbance over the Caribbean Sea. One person was killed in the Alta Verapaz Department and approximately 2,100 people required evacuation across Guatemala. Government officials deployed emergency teams and Q40 million (US$5.22 million) was available for relief operations. Dozens of homes were affected and four people were killed. The Goascorán River overflowed its banks twice in two days, inundating surrounding communities. Owing to widespread flooding, authorities suspended school activities across the country on October 19. In Nicaragua, a landslide buried four miners in Bonanza; one died while the others were rescued. The Ulúa River in Honduras over-topped its banks for the first time in 17 years on October 18, prompting the evacuation of more than 200 people. Furthermore, flooding damaged 10 homes in Jacó, Costa Rica.

The aforementioned rains extended into Southwestern and Northeastern Mexico, falling from October 18–20; precipitation was enhanced by another tropical disturbance over the northwestern Caribbean Sea. Portions of Quintana Roo saw their most intense rainfall event on record, with  observed in Chetumal. This surpassed the previous record of  during Hurricane Wilma in 2005. Flooding affected approximately 1,500 homes in the city, with 150 people seeking refuge in public shelters. Damage in Chetumal was pegged at MX$1.4 billion (US$85.3 million). Seven municipalities were declared disaster areas accordingly. Flooding in Tabasco affected  of crops. In Oaxaca, several roads were washed out by the accompanying floods and mudslides, particularly in the Sierra Norte region. Widespread flooding affected large areas of Chiapas and Guerrero, prompting dozens of evacuations. In Tapachula, Chiapas,  of rain fell in just 90 minutes, triggering flash floods that caught residents by surprise. Hundreds of families were affected and 64 homes were damaged or destroyed.

Impact as a tropical cyclone

Mexico

Hurricane Patricia made landfall in Jalisco as a Category 4 hurricane during the evening of October 23. This, alongside effective evacuations, is credited for the relatively low death toll, despite the hurricane's intensity. Several small communities along the path sustained tremendous damage, however. Had the hurricane moved farther east or west, the densely populated areas surrounding Manzanillo or Puerto Vallarta would have suffered a direct hit.

Throughout the affected region, the storm's powerful winds left 261,989 people without electricity. Twenty-one of the nation's thirty-one states, and the Federal District, were affected by the hurricane's rain. Roughly  of crops were affected across Colima, Jalisco, Michoacán, and Nayarit, with  deemed a total loss and  partially damaged. Six deaths occurred due to direct or indirect effects of the hurricane, all in Jalisco. Damage assessments indicate total losses around MX$5.4 billion (US$325 million), primarily from agriculture and infrastructure.

Jalisco

Striking Jalisco as a strong Category 4 hurricane, Patricia wrought tremendous damage, though the most extreme effects were relatively localized. In the small community of Emiliano Zapata, the hurricane's violent winds tore roofs off homes and business. Countless trees were defoliated, stripped of their branches, snapped, or uprooted. Hillsides along the immediate landfall area were largely stripped of vegetation. Storm chaser Josh Morgerman described the aftermath: "... the tropical landscape was transformed into something barren and wintry." Furthermore, the winds toppled concrete power poles and crumpled transmission towers.

A total of six deaths in incidents related to Patricia were reported in the state. Two of these deaths occurred when a tree toppled over in the storm's powerful winds. A woman was also hospitalized after sustaining injuries in the same incident. Another four people were killed in an automobile accident in southern Jalisco. Two of the victims died in the wreckage and the other two died after being brought to a hospital.

Throughout Jalisco, approximately 9,000 homes were damaged or destroyed. The coastal hamlet of Chamela, home to 40 families, was completely flattened. Damage from agriculture amounted to roughly MX$168 million (US$10.1 million). Total damage reached to MX$1.139 billion (US$68.6 million). A cargo ship—the  bulk carrier Los Llanitos—was shifted off-course by the hurricane and grounded near Barra de Navidad, Jalisco. Her 27 crew were unharmed but required rescue by a military helicopter. The ship was subsequently deemed a total loss and crews began scrapping the vessel on-site in February 2016.

Colima and Michoacán

In nearby Colima, preliminary surveys indicated localized but severe damage. Severe damage was incurred by the banana crops, with losses from the fruit alone estimated at MX$500 million (US$30.1 million). Total damage in the state reached MX$1.7 billion (US$102.5 million).

Although Patricia made landfall farther west, damage across Michoacán was severe. Numerous communities were temporarily isolated as roads were either rendered impassible or washed away altogether by floods. A total of 1,512 homes were damaged and another 127 were destroyed across the state, including 600 in Coahuayana. The storm severely damaged 150 homes in the Arteaga Municipality. A portion of Highway 200 was shut down in Aquila. In Coahuayana alone,  of bananas were ruined, the greatest loss of crops in the municipality's history; thousands of residents lost their jobs as a result of the damage. Losses to health facilities in the state reached MX$13.5 million (US$814,000).

Other states
The hurricane produced large swells along the shores of Guerrero on October 22, causing damage to coastal structures. The remnants of Patricia brought heavy rain to much of northern Mexico on October 24. Dozens of structures sustained damage and hundreds were left without power, with areas in Reynosa and Río Bravo particularly affected.

United States 
Patricia's direct effects in Texas were limited to southern areas of the state. Moisture associated with the hurricane streamed ahead of its circulation and interacted with a frontal boundary over the region. Antecedent rains saturated the region and produced severe flooding, with cars flooded and a train derailed. Fears arose that the collective effects of these storms would produce deadly floods, similar to those in May earlier in the year; however, no deaths resulted. Houston received  of rain during a 24-hour span from October 24–25, and a brief tornado caused minor damage near the city. An estimated , or more, accumulated across the Progreso–Weslaco area. Several feet of water rendered roads impassible, stranded cars, and affected more than 500 homes. Twenty-six water rescues were conducted in the area. Damage was estimated at $50 million. Several roads in and around Corpus Christi were inundated, including part of Interstate 37. Two hours of "blinding rains" flooded the majority of eastern Willacy County, prompting multiple water rescues, and leaving $2.5 million in damage. Remnant moisture then moved north and northwest through the Great Lakes, Appalachia and Mid-Atlantic states, and Florida Panhandle before exiting the nation.

Aftermath
In the aftermath of the hurricane, 5,791 Marines from Mexico's Naval Infantry Force were deployed to assist with recovery and rescue efforts. Rescuers reached some of the hardest-hit areas within a day of Patricia's landfall. Red Cross volunteers began needs assessments on October 24 and distribution of humanitarian aid started the following day. Power was restored to 88 percent of those affected within two days of the storm. Through the nation's livestock catastrophe fund, MX$150 million (US$9.04 million) were allocated for agricultural areas affected by the storm on October 29. Of this total, MX$76 million (US$4.58 million) were delegated to Jalisco.

The Secretariat of Social Development's budget allowed for MX$250 million (US$15.1 million) in relief funds for Jalisco. Of this, MX$34 million (US$2.05 million) were allocated for affected persons. On October 27, Rafael Pacchiano Alamán announced an initial fund of MX$5.3 million (US$319,000) through the Temporary Employment Program (Programa de Empleo Temporal) to help spur economic recovery in Colima. On October 28, 15 of Jalisco's 125 municipalities were declared disaster areas. Through late January 2016, Instituto Nacional del Emprendedor provided entrepreneurs with MX$3.577 million (US$216,000) in funds.

In January 2016, the Michoacán Ministry of Social Development enacted a MX$10 million (US$603,000) rehabilitation program to build 605 homes in affected communities.

Retirement

Due to the hurricane's extreme intensity and the damages caused in Mexico, the name Patricia was retired by the World Meteorological Organization on April 25, 2016. The name chosen to replace it for the 2021 Pacific hurricane season was Pamela.

See also

Weather of 2015
Tropical cyclones in 2015
List of the most intense tropical cyclones
List of tropical cyclone records
List of Category 5 Pacific hurricanes
Timeline of the 2015 Pacific hurricane season 
Typhoon Nancy (1961) – strongest one-minute maximum sustained winds on record prior to Patricia (tied)
Typhoon Tip (1979) – most intense tropical cyclone ever recorded 
Hurricane Linda (1997) – strongest and most intense Pacific hurricane prior to Patricia
Hurricane Kenna (2002) – Category 5 hurricane, made landfall at Category 4 intensity north of where Patricia made landfall
Hurricane Willa (2018) – Category 5 hurricane, made landfall at Category 3 intensity north of where Patricia made landfall

Notes

References

External links

The National Hurricane Center's advisory archive for Hurricane Patricia
The National Hurricane Center's advisory graphics archive for Hurricane Patricia
 for Hurricane Patricia
ReliefWeb page for Hurricane Patricia

2015 Pacific hurricane season
Category 5 Pacific hurricanes
2015 in Costa Rica
2015 in El Salvador
2015 in Guatemala
2015 in Honduras
2015 in Nicaragua
2015 in Texas
2015 in Mexico
Hurricanes in Costa Rica
Hurricanes in El Salvador
Hurricanes in Guatemala
Hurricanes in Honduras
Hurricanes in Nicaragua
Hurricanes in Texas
Pacific hurricanes in Mexico
Retired Pacific hurricanes
Floods in Texas
October 2015 events
Tropical cyclones in 2015